Azria is a surname. Notable people with the surname include:

 Lubov Azria (born 1967), French fashion designer
 Max Azria (1949–2019), Tunisia-born fashion designer
 René-Pierre Azria, French businessman

See also
 Aria (name)